Thomas Bowie may refer to:
 Thomas Fielder Bowie (1808–1869), American politician
 Thomas Bowie (rugby union) (1889–1972), Scottish rugby union player